The Eight Great Prose Masters of the Tang and Song refers to a grouping of prose writers, during the Tang and Song Dynasties, who were renowned for their prose writing, mostly in the essay form. Almost all of the eight masters are also accomplished in other aspects of Chinese politics and culture of their time. Two of the writers (Han Yu and Liu Zongyuan) are from the Tang, while four are from the Song.

Background

The list of the eight writers was first drawn up in the Ming Dynasty. Zhu You (朱右), a scholar during the early Ming, first collected the essays of the eight, but it was the late Ming scholar Mao Kun (茅坤) who coined the name in a book called "Compiled Transcriptions of the Eight Great Prose Masters of the Tang and Song"; the subsequent popularity of this book cemented the place of the eight as masters of Chinese prose writing.

During the Qing dynasty, Wei Yuan had eight volumes on the Eight Prose Masters (《纂评唐宋八大家文读本》).

The Eight 
 Han Yu (768–824)
 Liu Zongyuan (773–819)
 Ouyang Xiu (1007–1072)
 Su Xun (1009–1066)
 Su Shi (1037–1101)
 Su Zhe (1039–1112)
 Wang Anshi (1021–1086)
 Zeng Gong (1019–1083)

Of the eight writers, the first two were from the Tang Dynasty, and the other six from the Song. Three of them were from the same family: Su Xun (father), Su Shi (elder brother) and Su Zhe (younger brother).

In terms of prose, Han Yu and Liu Zongyuan were stylistic innovators. Responding against the florid and tightly restricted pianwen prose form, which had become de rigueur since the Han dynasty, they promoted and wrote essays in a more direct, colloquial style which harkened back to more ancient Chinese prose; as a result, this literary movement was known as the Classical Prose Movement. While the movement would wane in the late Tang, Ouyang Xiu became another proponent in the Song Dynasty, revitalising a thread of Chinese prose writing that would exist until the late Qing.

References 

Chinese essayists
Tang dynasty literature
Song dynasty literature